The Communauté de communes du Vimeu is a communauté de communes in the Somme département and in the Hauts-de-France région of France. It was formed on 1 January 2017 by the merger of the former Communauté de communes du Vimeu Industriel and the Communauté de communes du Vimeu Vert. Its seat is in Friville-Escarbotin.

Territorial community

Geography 
The territory of the communauté de communes corresponds to the communes of the two previous communautés which it brought together:

 Communauté de communes du Vimeu Industriel
 Communauté de communes du Vimeu Vert

Composition 
The communauté de communes currently consists of the following 25 communes:

Organisation

Seat 
The seat of the communauté is fixed in Friville-Escarbotin at 18 rue Albert Thomas.

List of presidents

References

Vimeu
Vimeu